Nil is a surname. Notable people with the surname include:

 Alain De Nil (born 1966), Belgian football player
 Eva Nil (1909–1990), Egyptian-born Brazilian film actress
 Lon Nil (died 1970), Cambodian political figure
 Maxi Nil (born 1981), Greek singer